Hail Caesar may refer to:

 Hail Caesar (1994 film), a comedy directed by Anthony Michael Hall
 "Hail Caesar" (song), 1995, by AC/DC
 Hail, Caesar!, a 2016 comedy film directed by the Coen brothers